Ab Barik-e Olya (also Romanized as Āb Bārīk-e ‘Olyā; also known as Āb Bārīk and Āb Bārīk-e Bālā) is a village in Firuzabad Rural District, Firuzabad District, Selseleh County, Lorestan Province, Iran. At the 2006 census, its population was 513 in 99 families.

References 

Towns and villages in Selseleh County